Hresivskyi is an urban-type settlement located in Simferopol Municipality, Crimea. Population:

Demographics
According to the 2001 census, 10,101 people lived in Hresivskyi. The language composition was as follows:

See also
Simferopol Municipality

References

Urban-type settlements in Crimea
Simferopol Municipality